HMS G11 was a G-class submarine of the Royal Navy in service during the First World War. One of six of her class built by Vickers at Barrow in Furness, she was launched on 22 February 1916, and commissioned on 13 May 1916.

Description
The G-class submarines were designed by the Admiralty in response to a rumour that the Germans were building double-hulled submarines for overseas duties. They displaced  on the surface and  submerged. The G-class submarines had a crew of 30 officers and ratings. They had a partial double hull.

For surface running, the boats were powered by two  Vickers two-stroke diesel engines, each driving one propeller shaft. When submerged each propeller was driven by a  electric motor. They could reach  on the surface and  underwater.

The boats were intended to be armed with one 21-inch (53.3 cm) torpedo tube in the bow and two 18-inch (45 cm) torpedo tubes on the beam. This was revised, however, while they were under construction, the 21-inch tube was moved to the stern and two additional 18-inch tubes were added in the bow. They carried two 21-inch and eight 18-inch torpedoes. The G-class submarines were also armed with a single  deck gun.

War service

Like the rest of her class, G11s role was to patrol an area of the North Sea in search of German U-boats.

Loss
On 22 November 1918, whilst under the temporary command of Lieutenant Commander George Fagan Bradshaw, G11 was returning to her base at Blyth, Northumberland, from Dogger Bank patrol following the Armistice. The boat's log had been disabled earlier and Bradshaw underestimated her speed in the inclement weather, with the result that the boat had travelled substantially further than he had reckoned. The impact tore the keel off and the boat was abandoned, two of her crew drowning during the evacuation.

G11s regular captain Lieutenant Richard Douglas Sandford VC had not sailed on her last mission, having succumbed to typhoid fever. He died at Eston hospital the day after learning his ship had been lost.

References

 

 

 

British G-class submarines
World War I submarines of the United Kingdom
Ships built in Barrow-in-Furness
Royal Navy ship names
1916 ships
Shipwrecks of Northumberland
Maritime incidents in 1918